The Napa County Courthouse Plaza is a complex in Napa, California, which consists of the Napa County Courthouse and the Hall of Records. The two buildings occupy an entire city block, which includes open areas and landscaping to create the site's plaza setting. The High Victorian Italianate courthouse was built in 1878 to replace the original 1856 courthouse. The courthouse continues to serve as the seat of Napa County government. The 1916 Hall of Records is a federally sponsored records building designed by William H. Corlett. The Renaissance Revival building represents an early use of reinforced concrete as a building material; the material became popular nationwide in the 1920s.

The plaza was added to the National Register of Historic Places on June 18, 1992.

The courthouse was damaged by the 2014 South Napa earthquake.  A $11.6M contract for restoration of the courthouse was awarded by Napa County in August 2017.

References

Courthouses on the National Register of Historic Places in California
County courthouses in California
Italianate architecture in California
Renaissance Revival architecture in California
Government buildings completed in 1916
Buildings and structures in Napa County, California
National Register of Historic Places in Napa County, California
Government buildings completed in 1878